Jacques Nicolas Bellin (1703 – 21 March 1772) was a French hydrographer, geographer, and member of the French intellectual group called the philosophes.

Bellin was born in Paris. He was hydrographer of France's hydrographic office, member of the Académie de Marine and of the Royal Society of London. Over a 50-year career, he produced many maps of particular interest to the Ministère de la Marine. His maps of Canada and of French territories in North America (New France, Acadia, Louisiana) are particularly valuable.  He died at Versailles.

First Ingenieur de la Marine

In 1721, at age 18, he was appointed hydrographer (chief cartographer) to the French Navy. In August 1741, he became the first Ingénieur de la Marine of the Dépot des cartes et plans de la Marine (the French Hydrographical Office) and was named Official Hydrographer of the French King.

Prodigious work, high standard of excellence

During his reign the Depot published a prodigious number of charts and maps, among which were large folio-format sea-charts of France, the Neptune Francois. He also produced a number of sea-atlases of the world, e.g., the Atlas Maritime and the Hydrographie Francaise. These gained fame, distinction and respect all over Europe and were republished throughout the 18th and even in the succeeding century.

Bellin also created smaller format maps such as the 1764 Petit Atlas Maritime (5 vols.) containing 580 finely detailed charts.

Bellin set a very high standard of workmanship and accuracy thus gaining for France a leading role in European cartography and geography. Many of his maps were copied by other mapmakers of Europe.

Member of philosophes

He was one of the Encyclopédistes, a group of 18th century intellectuals in France who compiled the 35-volume Encyclopédie which was edited by Denis Diderot and Jean le Rond d'Alembert. Bellin contributed 994 articles.

The Encyclopédistes, were part of the group called philosophes among whose members were the great minds of the Age of Enlightenment, e.g., Montesquieu, Voltaire, Rousseau, Baron d'Holbach.

Innocent party to a geographical error

Bellin contributed a number of maps to 15-vol. Histoire Générale des Voyages of Antoine François Prévost or simply known l'Abbé Prevost. One of these maps led to a geographical blunder whose impact reverberates to this day. This was the map of the Philippines which Bellin copied from a world-famous chart produced in 1734 by the Spanish missionary to the Philippines, Fr. Pedro Murillo Velarde.

Unlike many other European mapmakers of the time who outright appropriated Murillo's map, Bellin had the intellectual integrity to fully credit Murillo as his source, an open acknowledgement shown in the title cartouche of Bellin's map which came out the same year as the original work by Murillo.

Shown in Bellin's map was an island named "Limasava", a word invented in 1667 by Spanish friar, Fr. Francisco Combés, S.J., to refer to the way station of the Armada de Molucca under the command of the Portuguese captain-general Fernao de Magalhaes during its navigation in Philippine waters. Combés, who had not read a single eyewitness account of the Magellan expedition relied on two sources, the hopelessly garbled Italian translation of the Antonio Pigafetta account by Giovanni Battista Ramusio and the secondhand account by Antonio de Herrera y Tordesillas. Ramusio wrote the fleet anchored in March–April 1521 in Butuan in Mindanao, and from there sailed for Cebu with a brief stopover at "Messana". In the authentic Pigafetta account, the port was an isle named Mazzaua while the stopover isle was named Gatighan. Antonio de Herrera y Tordesillas gave a faithful narration of the Mazzaua anchorage.

Combés disregarded de Herrera's version and adopted Ramusio's. He wrote that Magellan's fleet had anchored at Butuan and from there sailed for Cebu making a stop at a way station he named Limasaua.

Five years earlier than Combés, Fr. Francisco Colín wrote the Armada moored at Butuan from March–April 1521 where Magellan and his men together with the natives celebrated an Easter Sunday mass on 31 March 1521. From Butuan the fleet sailed for Cebu making a brief stop at a way station he called "Dimasaua", an invented word meaning "this is not the Mazagua of Antonio de Herrera where supposedly an Easter Sunday mass was held which I already said happened in Butuan."

This episode was projected in the 1734 map made by Murillo who used Combés name, "Limassava" not "Dimasaua" which map Bellin copied.

Gatighan becomes Limasava

In 1789, Augustinian Carlo Amoretti, Italian Encyclopedist and librarian of Biblioteca Ambrosiana in Milan, discovered the authentic Italian manuscript of Antonio Pigafetta among the scattered holdings of the library. Here it came out that the port of March–April 1521 was not Butuan but Mazaua. Amoretti, who himself had not read any of five eyewitness reports of the incident including two French versions of Pigafetta's account, asserted in a footnote that Mazaua was probably the isle named Limasava in Bellin's map, thus interchanging the real port of Mazaua with the way station Gatighan.

Largely with the appearance of the eyewitness account of Ginés de Mafra, the only seaman in Magellan's fleet to return to Mazaua, whose testimony reveals a concrete, measurable description of Mazaua, the skein starting from the garbled version of Pigafetta by Ramusio to the mishandling by Combés to Bellin and finally to Amoretti has been unraveled: Pigafetta's Gatighan is Bellin's Limasava.

Published works

Published during his lifetime were:
 Hydrographie française (1753)
 Carte de l'Amérique septentrionale (Map of Northern America) (1755)
 Le petit Atlas François. Recueil de Cartes et Plans des quatre parties du Monde (1758)
 Petit Atlas Maritime (1764)
 Nouvelle méthode pour apprendre la géographie (1769)
 Description géographique du golfe de Venise et de la Morée (1771)

See also
 Sea of the West

References
Library and Archives Canada – The Mapmakers: an essay in four parts (French)
 E. Taillemite. Dictionnaire des marins français. Paris, 1982.
 Jean-Marc Garant. Jacques-Nicolas Bellin (1703–1722), cartographe, hydrographe, ingénieur du ministère de la Marine: sa vie, son oeuvre, sa valeur historique. Thèse (M.A., Histoire), Montréal: 1973
Combés, Francisco. 1667. Historia de las islas de Mindanao, Iolo y sus adyacentes. W.E. Retana (ed.). Madrid 1897. 
de Jesus, Vicente C. (2002). Mazaua Historiography. Retrieved 27 February 2007, from MagellansPortMazaua mailing list, E. Taillemite. Dictionnaire des marins francais. Paris, 1982. 
Herrera, Antonio de. 1601. Historia general de los hechos de los Castellanos en las islas y tierrafirme del mar oceano, t. VI. Angel Gonzalez Palencia (ed.). Madrid 1947. 
Ramusio, Gian Battista. "La Detta navigatione per messer Antonio Pigafetta Vicentino". In: Delle navigatione... Venice: pp. 380–98.

External links

See a 1754 map by Jacques-Nicolas Bellin, Karte von der Erdenge Panama und den Provinzen Veragua, Terra Firma und Darien / zur allgemeinen Historie der Reisen, von dem Hrn Bellin ; Ing. de la Marine., hosted by the Portal to Texas History.
"Map of the Coast of Arabia, the Red Sea and the Persian Gulf" by Bellin that dates to 1740

1703 births
1772 deaths
18th-century French cartographers
Contributors to the Encyclopédie (1751–1772)
French exploration in the Age of Discovery
Fellows of the Royal Society
French male non-fiction writers
18th-century French male writers